Matthew NeSmith (born September 29, 1993) is an American professional golfer.

Amateur career
NeSmith won the 2011 Junior Heritage and the 2015 Players Amateur.

Korn Ferry Tour
On the 2019 Korn Ferry Tour, NeSmith won the Albertsons Boise Open to secure his PGA Tour card.

PGA Tour
After the first round, NeSmith held the lead at the 2021 Phoenix Open. NeSmith ended the tournament tied in seventh.

In March 2022, NeSmith recorded his best PGA Tour finish, with a T3 at the Valspar Championship, one shot outside of the playoff between Sam Burns, and Davis Riley.

Amateur wins
2011 Polo Junior Classic, Jones Cup Junior Invitational
2012 Azalea Invitational, FJ Invitational, Rolex Tournament of Champions
2015 Hootie @ Bulls Bay Intercollegiate, SEC Championship, Players Amateur
2016 The Cleveland Golf Palmetto Invite, General Hackler Championship

Source:

Professional wins (1)

Korn Ferry Tour wins (1)

Results in major championships
Results not in chronological order in 2020.

CUT = missed the halfway cut
NT = No tournament due to the COVID-19 pandemic

Results in The Players Championship

CUT = missed the halfway cut

See also
2019 Korn Ferry Tour Finals graduates

References

External links

American male golfers
South Carolina Gamecocks men's golfers
PGA Tour golfers
Korn Ferry Tour graduates
Golfers from South Carolina
People from North Augusta, South Carolina
1993 births
Living people